is a Japanese male artistic gymnast and part of the national team. He won the gold medal at the 2014 Asian Games in men's gymnastics artistic individual all-around, as well as in the parallel bars and in the team event, held in Incheon, South Korea. He also won the bronze medal in men's floor gymnastics at the 2014 Asian Games.

References

Living people
Japanese male artistic gymnasts
Place of birth missing (living people)
Gymnasts at the 2014 Asian Games
Asian Games medalists in gymnastics
1994 births
Gymnasts at the 2010 Summer Youth Olympics
Asian Games gold medalists for Japan
Asian Games bronze medalists for Japan
Medalists at the 2014 Asian Games
Universiade medalists in gymnastics
Universiade gold medalists for Japan
Universiade silver medalists for Japan
Universiade bronze medalists for Japan
Medalists at the 2015 Summer Universiade
Medalists at the 2017 Summer Universiade
Gymnasts from Tokyo
20th-century Japanese people
21st-century Japanese people